Miss South Africa 2018 was the 60th edition of Miss South Africa. It was held on 27 May 2018 at the Sun Arena at Time Square in Pretoria. It was simulcasted as a live broadcast on M-Net and Mzansi Magic, and was hosted by Bonang Matheba. For the first time, two separate delegates were selected to represent South Africa at Miss World and Miss Universe, but only one was crowned Miss South Africa.

Twenty eight semi-finalists from different provinces were selected from the 491 women who entered, but only twelve finalists were chosen to compete for the crown. During the live telecast, the Top 12 was narrowed to a Top 5 and then a Top 2. The Top 2 were awarded separate titles, Miss Universe South Africa, won by Tamaryn Green, and Miss World South Africa, won by Thulisa Keyi. Green went on to be crowned Miss South Africa 2018 by her predecessor Adè van Heerden of Western Cape. Green represented South Africa at Miss Universe 2018 where she placed as First Runner-up. Keyi represented South Africa at Miss World 2018, placing in the Top 30.

Results
Color keys

Semi-finalists

Judges 
Anele Mdoda – radio jockey
Khaya Dlanga – marketing personality
Khanyi Dhlomo – businesswoman and media mogul
Janez Vermeiren – entrepreneur and television presenter
Michelle van Breda – magazine editor
Siba Mtongana – celebrity chef and television personality
Rolene Strauss – Miss South Africa 2014 and Miss World 2014

International Placements 
Tamaryn Green competed at Miss Universe 2018 held in Bangkok, Thailand. Green placed as the First Runner-up to Catriona Gray of Philippines.
Thulisa Keyi competed at Miss World 2018 held in Sanya, China. Keyi placed in the Top 30 of said pageant.

References

External links

2018
2018 beauty pageants
2018 in South Africa
May 2018 events in South Africa